Purton F.C. are a football club based in Purton, near Swindon, in Wiltshire, England.

History

Purton Football Club was established in 1924. They played in the FA Cup in the six seasons preceding the Second World War, but never advanced further than the Preliminary Round. They joined the Hellenic Football League Division One in 1986 and won that division in 1995–96. After some league restructuring, they were placed in Division One West which they won in 2003–04, but on neither occasion was the team promoted to the Premier Division due to not meeting the relevant ground criteria (primarily regarding floodlights).

The club stepped down to the Wiltshire Senior League for 2017–18. After finishing bottom of the league's Premier Division in 2021–22, they were relegated to the newly formed Division 1 for the 2022–23 season.

Ground

Purton play their home games at The Red House, Purton, Wiltshire, SN5 4DY.

Honours
Hellenic Football League Division One West
Champions 2003–04
Hellenic Football League Division One
Champions 1995–96
Wiltshire County FA Senior Cup
Winners (7) 1938–39, 1948–49, 1950–51, 1954–55, 1987–88, 1988–89, 1994–95
Runners up (2) 1997–98, 1999–2000

Records
FA Cup
Preliminary Round 1945–46, 1946–47, 1947–48, 1949–50, 1950–51

References

External links
 Purton F.C. – Wiltshire Senior League

Football clubs in Wiltshire
1924 establishments in England
Football clubs in England
Association football clubs established in 1924